The  (MVV; Munich Transport and Tariff Association) is the transit authority of the city of Munich, the capital of the German state of Bavaria. Its jurisdiction covers the city and its surrounding area, responsible for the Munich S-Bahn commuter trains, the Munich U-Bahn, the Munich tramway and buses.

The MVV coordinates transport and fares in area comprising the city of Munich and eight surrounding districts. It is jointly owned by the state of Bavaria, the city of Munich and the eight surrounding districts, which are:

 Landkreis Bad Tölz-Wolfratshausen
 Landkreis Dachau
 Landkreis Ebersberg
 Landkreis Erding
 Landkreis Freising
 Landkreis Fürstenfeldbruck
 Landkreis München
 Landkreis Starnberg

Transport services are provided by over 40 companies. These include the Bayerische Oberlandbahn, the Deutsche Bahn that also operates the S-Bahn, the Münchner Verkehrsgesellschaft that operates the U-Bahn, tramway and city buses, together with multiple operators of regional trains and buses.

References

External links
Official site

Transport in Munich
Transport associations in Germany
1971 establishments in West Germany
Companies based in Munich
Companies based in Bavaria
Transport companies established in 1971